"Long Night" is a single by Irish family band the Corrs, taken as the third single from their fourth studio album, Borrowed Heaven (2004). The song was written by Sharon Corr and released on 6 December 2004 in the United Kingdom. Even though it was not a hit around Europe or Australia, it became popular in Brazil after its use on a famous prime time national soap opera Senhora do Destino.

Music video
The video for "Long Night" only features Andrea and, very briefly, Sharon during her violin solo. Apart from that, we see different versions of Andrea moving backwards through a love affair with a young man. It was shot on 29 October 2004.

The location for the video shooting was Chicheley Hall in Buckinghamshire (north of London), which was built in the 18th century and is still open for public today. You can spot a picture of the entrance hall here.

Track listings

UK CD1 and European CD single
 "Long Night" (radio edit)
 "Long Night" (acoustic)

UK CD2
 "Long Night" (album version)
 "Hideaway" (acoustic)
 "Long Night" (video)
 "Long Night" (On the Road video)
 Making of the video

Australian CD single
 "Long Night" (album version)
 "Long Night" (acoustic)
 "Hideaway" (acoustic)

Charts

Release history

References

2004 singles
2004 songs
Atlantic Records singles
The Corrs songs
Pop ballads